The Liberal Party of Canada allows a number of individuals to automatically become delegates to their conventions.  The following is a list of such delegates to the 2006 Liberal leadership election.  The list includes both ex officio and at-large delegates to the convention.

Who is an ex officio delegate?

Section 16, paragraph 13 of the Liberal Party of Canada constitution lays out who may be delegates to the convention.  The following individuals are ex officio (automatic) delegates:

all members of the Queen's Privy Council for Canada who are members of the Liberal Party (Privy Councillor) (s.13(a))
all members of the Senate of Canada who are members of the Liberal Party (Senator)  (s.13(a))
all members of the House of Commons of Canada who are members of the Liberal Party (MP)  (s.13(a))
for electoral districts for the House of Commons which are not represented by a Liberal, the nominated candidate or, if there is no nominated candidate, the candidate from the last federal election (candidate) (s.13(a))
elected members of the national executive of the Liberal Party of Canada (executive)  (s.13(b))
seven officers of the Young Liberals of Canada, and the presidents of the Young Liberal organizations in each of the 13 provinces and territories of Canada (Young Liberals) (s.13(c))
seven officers of the National Women's Liberal Commission and the presidents of the Women Liberals organizations in each of the 13 provinces and territories (Woman Liberal)(s.13(c))
five officers of the Senior Liberals Commission (Senior Liberal) (s.13(c))
the president and three members of the executive of each of the provincial and territorial wings of the Liberal Party of Canada (provincial and territorial executives) (s.13(d))
two representatives from each provincial or territorial women's Liberal association/commission. (s.13(f))
two representatives from each provincial or territorial Seniors Liberals commission or association. (s.13(f1))
the president of each federal Liberal electoral district association (Riding President)  (s.13(g))
 10 delegates, five of whom shall be men and five of whom shall be women, selected by each provincial and territorial executive (PTA Delegates) (s.13(h))
the chair and members of the Revenue Committee of the Liberal Party of Canada (Revenue Committee)  (s.13(i))
past leaders of the Liberal Party of Canada (Past Leader)  (s.13(j))
the leaders of the Liberal Party in each province and territory;  (s.13(k))
eight officers of the Liberal Aboriginal Peoples' Commission, and the president or federal representative from each provincial and territorial Liberal Aboriginal organization (Aboriginal Liberal) (s.13(l))

Delegates

All ex officio delegates will be listed below by category.  Some individuals may qualify for their ex officio status in more than one category.  Subsequent mentions of such individuals will be denoted by † (dagger); for information on a delegate denoted by a dagger please scroll up to his/her original listing.

Senators

 (1) Hold parliamentary/caucus positions that require neutrality
 (2) Declared neutrality to seek LPC presidency.

MPs, candidates and riding presidents

Each riding's MP, or in the absence of an MP, nominated candidate or, in the absence of the nominated candidate, past candidate, is an automatic delegate.  These are listed here, those who are MPs are denoted by an asterisk (*).

Newfoundland and Labrador

Prince Edward Island

Nova Scotia

New Brunswick

(1) Convention Co-Chair

Quebec

Ontario

 (1) Hold parliamentary/caucus positions that require neutrality
 (2) Staff member of the Office of the Leader of the Opposition
 (3) Declared neutrality to seek LPC presidency.
 ** Glen Pearson is an MP-Elect having won the November 27 by election in the riding of London North Centre, Ontario

Manitoba

Saskatchewan

Alberta

(1) Convention Co-Chair

British Columbia

Territories

Privy Councillors

Pearson Ministry appointees

Trudeau Ministry appointees

Turner Ministry appointees

(1) Acting as chief returning officer of the leadership process

Mulroney Ministry appointees

Chrétien Ministry appointees

Martin Ministry appointees

Duplicates

The following privy councillors are listed and tracked in earlier categories:
	Reg	Alcock
	Larry	Bagnell
	Navdeep	Bains
	George	Baker
	Eleni	Bakopanos
	Sue	Barnes
	Mauril	Bélanger
	Carolyn	Bennett
	Maurizio	Bevilacqua
	Ethel	Blondin-Andrew
	Scott	Brison
	Sam	Bulte
	Gerry	Byrne
	Aileen	Carroll
	Sharon	Carstairs
	Brenda	Chamberlain
	Raymond	Chan
	Denis	Coderre
	Joe	Comuzzi
	Irwin	Cotler
	Roy	Cullen
	Pierre	De Bané
	Stéphane	Dion
	Ujjal	Dosanjh
	Ken	Dryden
	Wayne	Easter
	Arthur	Eggleton
	Mark	Eyking
	Joyce	Fairbairn
	Francis	Fox
	Liza	Frulla
	Hedy	Fry
	Roger	Gallaway
	Jon	Gerrard
	John	Godfrey
	Ralph	Goodale
	William	Graham
	Albina	Guarnieri
	André	Harvey
	Céline	Hervieux-Payette
	Charles	Hubbard
	Tony	Ianno
	Marlene	Jennings
	Serge	Joyal
	Jim	Karygiannis
	Jean	Lapierre
	Walt	Lastewka
	Dominic	LeBlanc
	Judi	Longfield
	Lawrence	MacAulay
	Paul	Macklin
	Gurbax	Malhi
	Diane	Marleau
	Paul	Martin
	Keith	Martin
	John	McCallum
	Joe	McGuire
	John	McKay
	Anne	McLellan
	Dan	McTeague
	Maria	Minna
	Andrew	Mitchell
	Shawn	Murphy
	Stephen	Owen
	Denis	Paradis
	James	Peterson
	Pierre	Pettigrew
	David	Price
	Robert	Rae
	Karen	Redman
	Geoff	Regan
	Fernand	Robichaud
	Lucienne	Robillard
	William	Rompkey
	Jacques	Saada
	Hélène	Scherrer
	Andy	Scott
	Judy	Sgro
	Raymond	Simard
	David	Smith
	Bob	Speller
	Belinda	Stronach
	Andrew	Telegdi
	Robert	Thibault
	Paddy	Torsney
	Tony	Valeri
	Joe	Volpe
	Susan	Whelan
	Bryon	Wilfert

National Executive
Table officers of the four commissions and various caucus chairs, who are voting members of the national executive, are listed under other categories.

(1) Members of Leadership Expense Committee must undertake to be neutral
(2) Interim Campaign Chairs have undertaken to remain neutral

Provincial and territorial association delegates

Provincial and territorial executive delegates
Three members of the executive of each of the provincial and territorial wings of the Liberal Party of Canada.

Provincial and territorial delegates
10 delegates, five of whom shall be men and five of whom shall be women, selected by each provincial
and territorial executive;

1 : Remaining neutral to seek a position on the National Executive

Commissions of the Liberal Party of Canada

Young Liberals of Canada

(1) Neutral: Running for National Executive Position Vice President (Francophone)
The Northwest Territories and Nunavut positions are listed as vacant  but under the constitution could be filled up until the time of registration at the convention

The National Women's Liberal Commission

The National Women's Liberal Commission Executive

 The Northwest Territories and Nunuvat positions are listed as vacant  .  However, under the constitution these positions could be filled up until the time of registration at the convention.
(2) Members of Leadership Expense Committee must undertake to be neutral
(3) Jennifer Pereira - served as Kennedy SK Campaign Director

The National Women's Liberal Commission delegates
Two representatives from each provincial or territorial women's Liberal association/commission.

The Senior Liberals Commission

The Senior Liberals Commission Executive

(1) Members of Leadership Expense Committee must undertake to be neutral

The Senior Liberals Commission PTA delegates

Two representatives from each provincial or territorial Seniors Liberals commission or association.

Aboriginal Peoples' Commission

The Prince Edward Island, New Brunswick, Yukon and Nunavut positions are listed as vacant   but under the constitution could be filled up until the time of registration at the convention.
(1) APC returning officer

Revenue Committee members
(This list of membership is probably NOT up to date)

(1) Members of Leadership Expense Committee must undertake to be neutral

Past leaders
(All past leaders are already listed as MPs or Privy Councillors)

Jean Chrétien†
Paul Martin†
John Turner†

Provincial party leaders
The leaders of the Liberal Party in each province and territory.

The Northwest Territories and Nunavut operate under a non-partisan consensus government, therefore there are no Liberal Party leaders from these territories.

Summary of endorsements by ex officio and PTA selected delegates

 (*) Asterisk: represents total percentage of undeclared ex officio delegates.

Summary of endorsements by Members of Parliament by province

 * Glen Pearson is an MP-elect having won the November 27 by election in London North Centre, Ontario.  He subsequently endorsed Stéphane Dion.

Unaffiliated MPs and Senators

Undecided Members of Parliament (1 of 102)
 Belinda Stronach, Newmarket—Aurora, ON

Undecided Senators (9 of 63)
Willie Adams, Nunavut
George Baker, Newfoundland and Labrador
Ione Jean Christensen, Yukon
Eymard Georges Corbin, New Brunswick
Ross Fitzpatrick, British Columbia
Yoine Goldstein, Quebec
Paul J. Massicotte, Quebec
Lorna Milne, Ontario
Lucie Pépin, Quebec

Neutral Members of Parliament (9 of 102)
 Raymond Bonin (Nickel Belt, ON), Chairman of the Liberal Caucus
 Bill Graham (Toronto Centre, ON), Interim Leader of the Liberal Party
 Jean Lapierre (Outremont, QC), Former Cabinet Minister
 Dominic LeBlanc (Beauséjour, NB), Co-Chairman of the Leadership Convention
 Paul Martin (LaSalle—Émard, QC), Former Prime Minister
 Peter Milliken  (Kingston and the Islands, ON), Speaker of the House of Commons
 Karen Redman (Kitchener Centre, ON), Liberal Caucus Whip
 Lucienne Robillard (Westmount—Ville-Marie, QC), Interim Deputy Leader of the Liberal Party
 Tom Wappel (Scarborough Southwest, ON), backbench MP will not endorse anyone due to lack of a social conservative

Neutral Senators (4 of 63)
Catherine Callbeck, PEI
Dan Hays, Alberta, Leader of the Opposition in the Senate
Serge Joyal, Quebec
Marie-Paule Poulin, Northern Ontario, candidate for Party Presidency
Source: The Hill Times, June 12

See also

Endorsements for the Liberal Party of Canada leadership election, 2006

References

External links

Endorsement pages in campaign websites
Stéphane Dion 
Martha Hall Findlay
Michael Ignatieff
Gerard Kennedy
Bob Rae

Liberal Party of Canada